Brown's Ferry Park is a  park in the Clackamas County portion of the city of Tualatin in the U.S. state of Oregon. The park is located along the Tualatin River.

It is named for  Zenas J. Brown who operated the first ferry in the Tualatin area, and who claimed land at this location in 1850 through the Donation Land Act.

The park includes walking paths, picnic tables, kayak and canoe rentals and a canoe ramp and dock, a wildlife viewing blind, a river overlook platform, and an old barn with interpretative signage.

References

External links

Canoeing at Brown's Ferry Park

Tualatin, Oregon
Municipal parks in Oregon
Parks in Clackamas County, Oregon